The Gray County Courthouse in Pampa, Texas was built in 1929.  It was listed on the National Register of Historic Places in 1998.

It was designed in Beaux-Arts style by architects W.R. Kaufman & Son, and was built by Harland L. Case.

See also

National Register of Historic Places listings in Gray County, Texas
Recorded Texas Historic Landmarks in Gray County
List of county courthouses in Texas

References

Courthouses in Texas
Courthouses on the National Register of Historic Places in Texas
National Register of Historic Places in Gray County, Texas
Beaux-Arts architecture in Texas
Government buildings completed in 1929